Arthur McKee Rankin (1841–1914) was a Canadian born American stage actor and manager. He was the son of a member of the Canadian Parliament. After a dispute with his father he left home to become an actor. He made his stage debut in Rochester, New York in 1861 using the name George Henley.  In 1863 he was seen at Wood's Theatre in Cincinnati in the play The Stranger as The Count. During this time he was engaged by Mrs. John Drew at her Arch Street Theatre in Philadelphia. Rankin, a Canadian, had no role or participation in the American Civil War. In 1866 he appeared at the Olympic Theatre in London run by Mrs. John Wood. Rankin increasingly became popular in the melodramas of the period  and in 1867 was in a play called The Hunchback. In 1870 he appeared with Lydia Thompson in Mosquito and was a leading man from 1873-75 at the famous Union Square Theatre. Having married Elizabeth Blanchard better known as Kitty they acted together in the 1870s appearing in the smash hit play The Two Orphans in 1874.

Family
Rankin married actress Kitty Blanchard in 1869 and had two daughters, Gladys and Phyllis. Through an extra marital affair with Mabel Bert he fathered Doris Rankin in 1887. His daughters' various marriages aligned him with other theatrical families. Gladys married Sidney Drew circa 1891. Phyllis was later the wife of Harry Davenport whose father and sister were E. L. Davenport and the famous Fanny Davenport. Doris Rankin married Lionel Barrymore in 1904. Both Sidney Drew and Lionel Barrymore descended from the famous Louisa Lane Drew of Philadelphia.

Death
Rankin's wife Kitty Blanchard died in a hotel in 1911. Its not clear whether they were divorced or separated. Rankin outlived his eldest daughter, Gladys, by 3 months dying in San Francisco on April 17, 1914.

Notable descendent
Rankin's great grandson was Arthur Rankin Jr. whose partnership with Jules Bass brought several Christmas holiday television classics from the Rankin-Bass company.

References

External links

McKee Rankin..Internet Broadway Database
Internet Movie Database
McKee Rankin(New York Public Library)

1841 births
1914 deaths
Burials at Kensico Cemetery
Canadian male stage actors
19th-century Canadian male actors